Seyyed Ghazeban Fazeli (also Romanized as Seyyed Ghaz̤ebān Fāz̤elī) is a village in Elhayi Rural District, in the Central District of Ahvaz County, Khuzestan Province, Iran. At the 2006 census, its population was 36, in 8 families.

References 

Populated places in Ahvaz County